Hurricane Helene was the ninth tropical storm, fourth hurricane, and strongest hurricane of the 2006 Atlantic hurricane season, tied with Gordon.

Helene was a long-lived Cape Verde hurricane that formed in the extreme southeastern part of the North Atlantic Ocean, peaking as a Category 3 hurricane on the Saffir-Simpson hurricane scale as it traversed the central Atlantic. It never affected land until the very end of its lifespan as a weak extratropical system, which had minor impact in the northern British Isles.

Meteorological history

In the second week of September, a strong tropical wave began to emerge off the coast of Africa. It was well-organized from the start, and on September 11, even before it emerged off the coast, the National Hurricane Center predicted that it could quickly develop into a tropical depression. That is indeed what happened, and it became Tropical Depression Eight on the morning of September 12. The enormous size of the depression made it fairly slow to develop, combined with some easterly wind shear in the eastern Atlantic and influence of the Saharan Air Layer to the north as it tracked south of the Cape Verde islands. Convection was also slow to build in, with little banding at first. The initial strengthening was delayed as a result. However, on September 13, the organization improved as banding became better defined, and that evening, the depression strengthened into Tropical Storm Helene.

The storm slowly strengthened over the warm waters of the eastern Atlantic thereafter as it tracked west-northwest. Some dry air from the Saharan Air Layer continued to slow development on September 14 as Helene remained a low-end tropical storm. However, a bout of intensification took place on September 15 as shear diminished. The storm became much better organized with well-defined banding, and leveled off that evening at just under hurricane intensity. On the morning of September 16, the storm began to develop a ragged eye, and the storm strengthened to hurricane status. The intensity leveled off for a while as a marginal Category 1 hurricane, as the intensification was slowed by the presence of moderate wind shear despite the absence of significant dry air. Late that evening, the storm began to slowly intensify once again.

On September 17, the intensification became more rapid and Helene quickly became a Category 2 hurricane that morning as the eye became clearer and surrounded by deep convection. Helene also turned more northward and slowed in the central Atlantic, which was in response to a weakness in the subtropical ridge farther north created by Gordon to the north. The northward turn shifted the course away from any land areas. As shear remained low and the oceans remained warm, Helene intensified slightly more, peaking as a solid Category 3 hurricane with  winds early on September 18. At that time, Helene and Gordon were at roughly the same longitude in the open ocean. Operationally, Helene was estimated to have had  winds, but the post-storm analysis downgraded it slightly. As Gordon moved eastward on the afternoon of 18th, a narrow ridge built in, forcing Helene westward. The eyewall collapsed somewhat, and Helene weakened slightly to a Category 2 hurricane, where it leveled off for about 48 hours until September 20 due to a lengthy eyewall replacement cycle and an elongated cloud pattern. On the 20th, Helene turned back to the northwest and weakened slightly due to a slight increase in wind shear. That afternoon, it was downgraded to a Category 1 hurricane, which Helene remained until becoming extratropical.

Early on September 21, the motion shifted to the north as it moved along the northwest periphery of the subtropical ridge. That general motion continued throughout the day, however, Helene began to turn more northeastward that evening along the edge of the subtropical ridge, east of Bermuda. A decrease in wind shear and relatively warm water around  kept the intensity mostly stationary, keeping Helene as a Category 1 hurricane. The intensity held around  before strengthening slightly late on September 22, despite losing some tropical characteristics (it was operationally downgraded to a tropical storm for a brief period) as it accelerated northeast in the north Atlantic. A QuikSCAT analysis early on September 23 confirmed a high-end Category 1 hurricane with  winds.

Helene transitioned into a "hybrid" storm with both tropical and extratropical characteristics that afternoon, with both a deep warm core and an asymmetric, frontal-like appearance. After that, increased shear weakened Helene once again, although it remained a hurricane-strength storm until it was fully extratropical on the morning of September 24. After becoming extratropical, the storm weakened as it tracked eastward, becoming a gale center west of Ireland early on September 27. It eventually merged with a larger extratropical low near the northern end of the British Isles late on the 27th.

Impact

While a tropical system, Helene never approached land. Three ships were caught in the outer bands of Helene; the strongest of which reported  sustained winds early on September 23 in the north Atlantic. Though it remained far away from the island, the hurricane produced rough waves in Bermuda.  The hurricane had a positive impact on surfing conditions on the East Coast of the United States.  As a weakened extratropical system, strong wind gusts were reported in Ireland and northern Scotland. The strongest reported wind gust in Ireland was at the Valentia Observatory, where  gusts were reported. In Scotland, the strongest gust was on South Uist Island in the Outer Hebrides, where  gusts were reported. No damage or fatalities were reported as a result of Helene.

See also

2006 Atlantic hurricane season
 Timeline of the 2006 Atlantic hurricane season
 List of storms in the 2006 Atlantic hurricane season

References

External links

The NHC's archive on Hurricane Helene

2006 Atlantic hurricane season
Category 3 Atlantic hurricanes
Helene (2006)
Hurricanes in Europe
Helene
September 2006 events in Europe
Helene